Delfina Pignatiello (born 19 April 2000) is an Argentine ex-swimmer. She participated in the 2017 FINA World Junior Swimming Championships.

She represented Argentina at the 2020 Summer Olympics.

Career 

She began swimming as a baby, taught by her mother, a swimming coach. She started competing at the age of 12.

Delfina participated in two junior World Championships (2015, 2017) and also in a senior short course World Championship (2016).
She made an Argentine record in 800 metres at the 2016 FINA World Swimming Championships (25m), where she came in 6th place.

She participated in the 2017 FINA World Junior Swimming Championships held in Indianapolis, USA, where she won two events: the 800 and 1500 metres freestyle. She also won the silver medal in the same competition in the 400 metres.

Delfina won two silver medals at the 2018 Summer Youth Olympics in the 400 and 800 metres freestyle.

In 2019, she won three gold medals at the Pan American Games in the 400, 800, and 1500 metres freestyle.

References

External links 

2000 births
Living people
Argentine female swimmers
People from San Isidro, Buenos Aires
Argentine people of Italian descent
Swimmers at the 2018 Summer Youth Olympics
Swimmers at the 2019 Pan American Games
Pan American Games medalists in swimming
Pan American Games gold medalists for Argentina
Argentine female freestyle swimmers
Medalists at the 2019 Pan American Games
Swimmers at the 2020 Summer Olympics
Sportspeople from Buenos Aires Province